The Sacred Heart Cathedral, commonly called the Hongjialou Cathedral, is the cathedral of the Roman Catholic Archdiocese of Jinan in the city of Jinan, the capital of Shandong Province, China. It is the largest church in the region and a landmark of Jinan.

The cathedral was constructed during the years 1901 to 1905 (and extended again in 1906). The building project was financed with funds from the indemnity that was stipulated by the Boxer Protocol. The basic layout of this Gothic Revival church is a Latin cross with two tall towers. It is reminiscent of Notre Dame de Paris. The main building of the church covers 1650 square meters and can accommodate about 800 people. The architect was the Franciscan brother Korbinian Paugger (庞会襄, born in Bolzano, died in Brixen in 1949 aged 94). The builder was the mason Lu Licheng from Suncun, a village in the Jinan area, who supervised nearly 1000 stonemasons for the construction project.

The cathedral was closed in 1966 due to the Cultural Revolution, its interior furnishings were dismantled. It was reopened again on Christmas Day 1985. In 1992, it was declared a heritage site of Shandong Province.

The cathedral is located between Hongjialou Square and the Hongjialou Campus of Shandong University. The cathedral compound also houses Holy Spirit Seminary (Shengshen Beixiu Yuan, founded in December 1998).

See also

List of sites in Jinan

References

Roman Catholic churches completed in 1905
Shandong University
Churches in Shandong
Roman Catholic cathedrals in China
Major National Historical and Cultural Sites in Shandong
Tourist attractions in Jinan
1905 establishments in China
20th-century Roman Catholic church buildings in China